Neochmia is a genus of estrildid finches found in Australasia. They are gregarious seed-eaters with short, thick, but pointed bills.

The members are:

References

Clement, Harris and Davis, Finches and Sparrows  

 
Bird genera
Taxa named by George Robert Gray
^